Suryanagar is a village in the Palghar district of Maharashtra, India. It is located in the Dahanu taluka.

Demographics 

According to the 2011 census of India, Suryanagar has 112 households. The effective literacy rate (i.e. the literacy rate of population excluding children aged 6 and below) is 92.86%.

References 
In Karnataka state, D.K (South Canara) District there is a place called Soorya Nagar. Pin Cod is 575007. This area is part of Padil Post. Near by railway track. 

Villages in Dahanu taluka